The Lunar X (also known as the Werner X) is a clair-obscur effect in which light and shadow creates the appearance of a letter 'X' on the rim of the Blanchinus, La Caille and Purbach craters.

The X is visible only for a few hours before the first quarter, slightly below the lunar terminator. Near to the X, the Lunar V is also visible, formed by Ukert crater and several other small craters.

References

External links
LPOD articles:
 
 
 
APOD articles:
 
  - also includes the Lunar V

Impact craters on the Moon
Moon